"Love Will Set You Free" is a ballad written by Swedish producer Martin Terefe and Ivor Novello Awards winner Sacha Skarbek. As sung by Engelbert Humperdinck, it was the United Kingdom entry to the 2012 Eurovision Song Contest, held in Baku, Azerbaijan, where it ultimately placed 25th. The song was unveiled by the BBC on 19 March 2012 on its Eurovision homepage.

Music video
A music video to accompany the release of "Love Will Set You Free" was first released onto YouTube on 19 March 2012 at a total length of three minutes.

Track listing

Charts

Release history

References

External links

Eurovision songs of 2012
Eurovision songs of the United Kingdom
Engelbert Humperdinck songs
2012 songs
2012 singles
Songs written by Sacha Skarbek
Songs written by Martin Terefe